Lewis Fry Richardson, FRS (11 October 1881 – 30 September 1953) was an English mathematician, physicist, meteorologist, psychologist, and pacifist who pioneered modern mathematical techniques of weather forecasting, and the application of similar techniques to studying the causes of wars and how to prevent them. He is also noted for his pioneering work concerning fractals and a method for solving a system of linear equations known as modified Richardson iteration.

Early life
Lewis Fry Richardson was the youngest of seven children born to Catherine Fry (1838–1919) and David Richardson (1835–1913). They were a prosperous Quaker family, David Richardson operating a successful tanning and leather-manufacturing business.

At age 12 he was sent to a Quaker boarding school, Bootham School in York, where he received an education in science, which stimulated an active interest in natural history. In 1898 he went on to Durham College of Science (a college of Durham University) where he took courses in mathematical physics, chemistry, botany, and zoology. He proceeded in 1900 to King's College, Cambridge, where he was taught physics in the natural sciences tripos by (among others) J. J. Thomson and graduated with a first-class degree in 1903. At age 47 he received a doctorate in mathematical psychology from the University of London.

Career
Richardson's working life represented his eclectic interests:
 National Physical Laboratory (1903–1904).
 University College Aberystwyth (1905–1906).
 Chemist, National Peat Industries (1906–1907).
 National Physical Laboratory (1907–1909).
 Manager of the physical and chemical laboratory, Sunbeam Lamp Company (1909–1912).
 Manchester College of Technology (1912–1913).
 Meteorological Office – as superintendent of Eskdalemuir Observatory (1913–1916).
 Friends Ambulance Unit in France (1916–1919).
 Meteorological Office at Benson, Oxfordshire (1919–1920).
 Head of the Physics Department at Westminster Training College (1920–1929).
 Principal, Paisley Technical College, now part of the University of the West of Scotland (1929–1940).

In 1926, he was elected to the Fellowship of the Royal Society.

Pacifism
Richardson's Quaker beliefs entailed an ardent pacifism that exempted him from military service during World War I as a conscientious objector, though this subsequently disqualified him from having any academic post. Richardson worked from 1916 to 1919 for the Friends' Ambulance Unit attached to the 16th French Infantry Division. After the war, he rejoined the Meteorological Office but was compelled to resign on grounds of conscience when it was amalgamated into the Air Ministry in 1920. He subsequently pursued a career on the fringes of the academic world before retiring in 1940 to research his own ideas. His pacifism had direct consequences on his research interests. According to Thomas Körner, the discovery that his meteorological work was of value to chemical weapons designers caused him to abandon all his efforts in this field, and destroy findings that he had yet to publish.

Weather forecasting
Richardson's interest in meteorology led him to propose a scheme for weather forecasting by solution of differential equations, the method used nowadays, though when he published Weather Prediction by Numerical Process in 1922, suitable fast computing was unavailable. He described his ideas thus:

"After so much hard reasoning, may one play with a fantasy? Imagine a large hall like a theatre, except that the circles and galleries go right round through the space usually occupied by the stage. The walls of this chamber are painted to form a map of the globe. The ceiling represents the north polar regions, England is in the gallery, the tropics in the upper circle, Australia on the dress circle and the Antarctic in the pit.
A myriad computers [people who compute] are at work upon the weather of the part of the map where each sits, but each computer attends only to one equation or part of an equation. The work of each region is coordinated by an official of higher rank. Numerous little "night signs" display the instantaneous values so that neighbouring computers can read them. Each number is thus displayed in three adjacent zones so as to maintain communication to the North and South on the map.
From the floor of the pit a tall pillar rises to half the height of the hall. It carries a large pulpit on its top. In this sits the man in charge of the whole theatre; he is surrounded by several assistants and messengers. One of his duties is to maintain a uniform speed of progress in all parts of the globe. In this respect he is like the conductor of an orchestra in which the instruments are slide-rules and calculating machines. But instead of waving a baton he turns a beam of rosy light upon any region that is running ahead of the rest, and a beam of blue light upon those who are behindhand.
Four senior clerks in the central pulpit are collecting the future weather as fast as it is being computed, and despatching it by pneumatic carrier to a quiet room. There it will be coded and telephoned to the radio transmitting station. Messengers carry piles of used computing forms down to a storehouse in the cellar.
In a neighbouring building there is a research department, where they invent improvements. But there is much experimenting on a small scale before any change is made in the complex routine of the computing theatre. In a basement an enthusiast is observing eddies in the liquid lining of a huge spinning bowl, but so far the arithmetic proves the better way. In another building are all the usual financial, correspondence and administrative offices. Outside are playing fields, houses, mountains and lakes, for it was thought that those who compute the weather should breathe of it freely." (Richardson 1922)

When news of the first weather forecast by the first modern computer, ENIAC, was received by Richardson in 1950, he responded that the results were an "enormous scientific advance." The first calculations for a 24-hour forecast took ENIAC nearly 24 hours to produce.

He was also interested in atmospheric turbulence and performed many terrestrial experiments. The Richardson number, a dimensionless parameter of the theory of turbulence is named for him. He famously summarised turbulence in rhyming verse in Weather Prediction by Numerical Process (p 66):

Big whirls have little whirls that feed on their velocity,
and little whirls have lesser whirls and so on to viscosity.
[A play on two lines of Augustus De Morgan's poem Siphonaptera,  "Great fleas have little fleas upon their backs to bite 'em, / And little fleas have lesser fleas, and so ad infinitum." (A Budget of Paradoxes, 1915). De Morgan's lines themselves reword two lines of Jonathan Swift's satirical poem "On Poetry: A Rapsody" of 1733.]

Richardson's attempt at numerical forecast
One of Richardson's most celebrated achievements is his retroactive attempt to forecast the weather during a single day—20 May 1910—by direct computation. At the time, meteorologists performed forecasts principally by looking for similar weather patterns from records, and then extrapolating forward. Richardson attempted to use a mathematical model of the principal features of the atmosphere, and use data taken at a specific time (7 AM) to calculate the weather six hours later ab initio. As meteorologist Peter Lynch makes clear, Richardson's forecast failed dramatically, predicting a huge  rise in pressure over six hours when the pressure actually was more or less static. However, detailed analysis by Lynch has shown that the cause was a failure to apply smoothing techniques to the data, which rule out unphysical surges in pressure. When these are applied, Richardson's forecast is revealed to be essentially accurate—a remarkable achievement considering the calculations were done by hand, and while Richardson was serving with the Quaker ambulance unit in northern France.

Mathematical analysis of war

Richardson also applied his mathematical skills in the service of his pacifist principles, in particular in understanding the basis of international conflict. For this reason, he is now considered the initiator, or co-initiator (with Quincy Wright and Pitirim Sorokin as well as others such as Kenneth Boulding, Anatol Rapaport and Adam Curle), of the scientific analysis of conflict—an interdisciplinary topic of quantitative and mathematical social science dedicated to systematic investigation of the causes of war and conditions of peace. As he had done with weather, he analysed war using mainly differential equations and probability theory. Considering the armament of two nations, Richardson posited an idealised system of equations whereby the rate of a nation's armament build-up is directly proportional to the amount of arms its rival has and also to the grievances felt toward the rival, and negatively proportional to the amount of arms it already has itself. Solution of this system of equations allows insightful conclusions to be made regarding the nature, and the stability or instability, of various hypothetical conditions which might obtain between nations.

He also originated the theory that the propensity for war between two nations was a function of the length of their common border. And in Arms and Insecurity (1949), and Statistics of Deadly Quarrels (1960), he sought to analyse the causes of war statistically. Factors he assessed included economics, language, and religion. In the preface of the latter, he wrote: "There is in the world a great deal of brilliant, witty political discussion which leads to no settled convictions. My aim has been different: namely to examine a few notions by quantitative techniques in the hope of reaching a reliable answer."

In Statistics of Deadly Quarrels Richardson presented data on virtually every war from 1815 to 1945. As a result, he hypothesized a base 10 logarithmic scale for conflicts. In other words, there are many more small fights, in which only a few people die, than large ones that kill many. While no conflict's size can be predicted beforehand—indeed, it is impossible to give an upper limit to the series—overall they do form a Poisson distribution. On a smaller scale he showed the same pattern for gang murders in Chicago and Shanghai. Others have noted that similar statistical patterns occur frequently, whether planned (lotteries, with many more small payoffs than large wins), or by natural organisation (there are more small towns with grocery stores than big cities with superstores).

Research on the length of coastlines and borders

Richardson decided to search for a relation between the probability of two countries going to war and the length of their common border. However, while collecting data, he found that there was considerable variation in the various published lengths of international borders. For example, that between Spain and Portugal was variously quoted as 987 or 1214 km, and that between the Netherlands and Belgium as 380 or 449 km.

The reason for these inconsistencies is the "coastline paradox". Suppose the coast of Britain is measured using a 200 km ruler, specifying that both ends of the ruler must touch the coast. Now cut the ruler in half and repeat the measurement, then repeat:

The smaller the ruler, the longer the resulting coastline. It might be supposed that these values would converge to a finite number representing the true length of the coastline. However, Richardson demonstrated that this is not the case: the measured length of coastlines, and other natural features, increases without limit as the unit of measurement is made smaller. This is known nowadays as the Richardson effect.

At the time, Richardson's research was ignored by the scientific community. Today, it is considered an element of the beginning of the modern study of fractals. Richardson's research was quoted by mathematician Benoît Mandelbrot in his 1967 paper How Long Is the Coast of Britain? Richardson identified a value (between 1 and 2) that would describe the changes (with increasing measurement detail) in observed complexity for a particular coastline; this value served as a model for the concept of fractal dimension.<ref>P. G. Drazin, "Fractals"; Collected Papers of Lewis Fry Richardson, Volume 1; Cambridge University Press, 1993; p. 45.</ref>

Patents for detection of icebergs
In April 1912, soon after the loss of the ship Titanic, Richardson registered a patent for iceberg detection using acoustic echolocation in air. A month later he registered a similar patent for acoustic echolocation in water, anticipating the invention of sonar by Paul Langevin and Robert Boyle 6 years later.

In popular culture
A fictional version of Richardson, named Wallace Ryman, plays a pivotal role in Giles Foden's novel Turbulence.

Richardson is mentioned in John Brunner's work, Stand on Zanzibar where Statistics of Deadly Quarrels is used as an argument that wars are inevitable.

Richardson's work is also mentioned in Poul Anderson's speculative fiction novelette, Kings Who Die.

Richardson is mentioned in Charlie Kaufman's 2020 novel Antkind.

Richardson's famous quote, "Big whirls have little whirls that feed on their velocity; little whirls have lesser whirls & so on to viscosity" is mentioned in the song "Dots & Lines" written and performed by lyricist/rapper Lupe Fiasco.

Personal life
In 1909 he married Dorothy Garnett (1885–1956), daughter of the mathematician and physicist William Garnett. They were unable to have children due to an incompatibility of blood types, but they adopted two sons and a daughter between 1920 and 1927.

Richardson's nephew Ralph Richardson became a noted actor. His great-nephew (through his wife Dorothy's eldest brother, (James Clerk) Maxwell Garnett, C.B.E.), Julian Hunt, went on to become a meteorologist and director general and chief executive of the British Meteorological Office from 1992 to 1997. A great-niece – of the same line of descent – is the former politician Virginia Bottomley, now Baroness Bottomley.

Legacy
Since 1997, the Lewis Fry Richardson Medal has been awarded by the European Geosciences Union for "exceptional contributions to nonlinear geophysics in general" (by EGS until 2003 and by EGU since 2004).

Winners have been:

 2023: Angelo Vulpiani
 2022: Ulrike Feudel
 2021: Bérengère Dubrulle
 2020: Valerio Lucarini
 2019: Shaun Lovejoy
 2018: Timothy N. Palmer
 2017: Edward Ott
 2016: Peter L. Read
 2015: Daniel Schertzer
 2014: Olivier Talagrand
 2013: Jürgen Kurths
 2012: Harry Swinney
 2011: Catherine Nicolis
 2010: Klaus Fraedrich
 2009: Stéphan Fauve
 2008: Akiva Yaglom
 2007: Ulrich Schumann
 2006: Roberto Benzi
 2005: Henk A. Dijkstra
 2004: Michael Ghil
 2003: Uriel Frisch
 2002: 
 2001: Julian Hunt
 2000: Benoit Mandelbrot
 1999: Raymond Hide
 1998: Vladimir Keilis-Borok

Since 1959, there has been a Peace Studies centre at Lancaster University named the Richardson Institute which carries out interdisciplinary research on peace and conflict in the spirit of Lewis Fry Richardson.

See also
 Anomalous diffusion
 Arms race
 Coastline paradox
 Energy cascade
 War cycles
 Magnetic helicity
 Richardson extrapolation
 Richardson number
 Modified Richardson iteration
 Richards equation
 Multiscale turbulence
 Takebe Kenko
 Frederick W. Lanchester
 List of peace activists

Notes

References
 Wilkinson, David. Deadly Quarrels: Lewis F. Richardson and the Statistical Study of War (University of California Press, 2018) online review
  320pp
 
 P.A. Davidson, Y. Kaneda, K. Moffatt, and K.R. Sreenivasan (eds, 2011).  A Voyage Through Turbulence, chapter 5, pp 187–208, Cambridge University Press  
 
 544pp "A Quaker mathematician" (Ch 8) and "Richardson on war" (Ch 9)
 
  290pp
 Richardson, L.F. (1939). "Generalized foreign politics". The British Journal of Psychology, monograph supplement No. 23.
 Richardson, L.F. (1960). Statistics of deadly quarrels. Pacific Grove, CA: Boxwood Press.
 1030pp; Volume 2: Quantitative psychology and studies of conflict.  , 778pp
 
  353pp
 Angeletti Ferdinando (2021) Storicismo matematico e pacifismo scientifico: due esempi di determinismo storico della metà del XX secolo in Iconografie europee'' di Walter Montanari e Shirin Zakeri (a cura di), Roma, Nuova Cultura ISBN 978-8-833-65368-6;

External links
 
 https://www.egu.eu/awards-medals/lewis-fry-richardson/

1881 births
1953 deaths
20th-century English  mathematicians
Academics of the University of Manchester Institute of Science and Technology
Academics of Aberystwyth University
Alumni of King's College, Cambridge
People educated at Bootham School
English cartographers
British conscientious objectors
English meteorologists
English physicists
English psychologists
English Quakers
Fellows of the Royal Society
Lewis
People associated with the University of the West of Scotland
Scientists from Newcastle upon Tyne
English Christian pacifists
Fluid dynamicists
People associated with the Friends' Ambulance Unit
20th-century psychologists
Alumni of Armstrong College, Durham
20th-century English businesspeople